Addran is an unincorporated community in Hopkins County, in the U.S. state of Texas.

History
A post office was established at Addran in 1890, and remained in operation until 1906. The community was named after AddRan Male & Female College.

References

Unincorporated communities in Hopkins County, Texas
Unincorporated communities in Texas